Roller Trio are a British jazz-rock trio, who formed whilst studying at Leeds College of Music in 2011.  In 2012, their eponymous debut studio album was nominated for the Mercury Prize alongside a nomination for the band as "Best Jazz Act" at the MOBO Awards that year.  In performance, John Fordham of The Guardian described their preview gig for the Mercury prize [as having] "the same wild insouciance that has made their sound a howl of fresh air." DJ and broadcaster Gilles Peterson described their music as "Dark, menacing, bass heavy – the new sound of UK jazzzzzzz!" They are known for their "epic memorably singalong melody hooks and blistering riffs".

In May 2017, the band reformed with TrioVD and Acoustic Ladyland guitarist Chris Sharkey replacing Luke Wynter; Their third album was released in June 2018 on Edition Records.

Members

Current
 James Mainwaring – saxophones
 Chris Sharkey – Guitar/Bass
 Luke Reddin-Williams – drums

Past
 Luke Wynter

Discography
Studio albums
 Roller Trio (2012)
 Fracture (2014)
 New Devices (2018) Edition Records
Live albums
 Live at Jazz in the Round (2012)
 Live in Rotterdam (2014)

References

External links

 
 
 

 James Mainwaring's official website

2010 establishments in England
English jazz ensembles
English rock music groups
English jazz-rock groups
Musical groups established in 2010
British musical trios
Musical groups from Leeds
Alumni of Leeds College of Music
Edition Records artists